Maurice Podoloff (August 18, 1890 – November 24, 1985) was an American lawyer and a basketball and ice hockey administrator. He served as the president of the Basketball Association of America (BAA) between 1946–1949, and the National Basketball Association (NBA) in 1949–1963.

Profile
Podoloff was born to a Russian Jewish family in the Russian Empire, on or about August 18, 1890. Doubt remains about birthplace and birthday; some talks about Yelisavetgrad, but he himself said he did not know exactly: "I guess they didn't keep records in Russia in those days", he said. "I was born on either Aug. 18 or Aug. 31, and it was somewhere in Ukraine, possibly near Odessa." In young boyhood his family emigrated to the United States, where he graduated from Hillhouse High School in New Haven, Connecticut in 1909, and then from Yale University in New Haven with a law degree in 1915.

In 1926, Podoloff opened the New Haven Arena on Grove Street in downtown New Haven with his father and two brothers. The Arena held over 4,000 people and hosted ice hockey, concerts, and circus events before it was demolished in 1974.

A distinguished lawyer, he was of impeccable character and was instrumental in the development and success of professional basketball. On June 6, 1946, already serving as president of the American Hockey League, he was appointed president of the newly formed Basketball Association of America (BAA), becoming the first person to lead two professional leagues simultaneously.

After BAA teams signed several of the best players in the National Basketball League, Podoloff negotiated a merger with the NBL to form the National Basketball Association, or NBA, in 1949. His great organizational and administrative skills were later regarded as the key factor that kept the league alive in its often stormy formative years.

As president, Podoloff expanded the NBA to as many as 17 teams in three divisions and worked out a 557-game schedule.

He introduced the BAA's collegiate draft in 1947, and in 1954 instituted the  NBA's 24-second shot clock created by Dan Biasone, owner of the Syracuse Nationals, and his executive vice-president, Leo Ferris, which quickened the pace of games and improved NBA basketball from a slow plodding game to a fast-paced sport. That same year, he increased national recognition of the NBA immensely by landing its first television contract.

During his NBA presidency, he meted out lifetime suspensions to 32 players who were involved in point shaving scandal in 1951. Among these players were Indianapolis Olympians players Ralph Beard and Alex Groza for their actions at University of Kentucky, and 1951's number one draft pick Gene Melchiorre, for his actions at Bradley University.

He stepped down as NBA president in 1963 after having greatly increased fan interest during the NBA's formative years and having improved the overall welfare of the sport of basketball through his foresight, wisdom and leadership.

Legacy
In his honor, the NBA named its annual league Most Valuable Player trophy the Maurice Podoloff Trophy, which lasted until 2022. Podoloff was subsequently honored with a new trophy dedicated in his name for the team with the best regular season record.

In 1974, Podoloff was inducted into the Naismith Memorial Basketball Hall of Fame, and in 2011 was inducted into the American Hockey League Hall of Fame. He was inducted into the International Jewish Sports Hall of Fame in 1989.

References

Further reading

External links
 
 Naismith Memorial Basketball Hall of Fame Bio
 Sportsecyclopedia.com

1890 births
1985 deaths
American people of Russian-Jewish descent
Businesspeople from New Haven, Connecticut
Emigrants from the Russian Empire to the United States
Jewish American sportspeople
Naismith Memorial Basketball Hall of Fame inductees
National Basketball Association commissioners
Yale University alumni
Yale Law School alumni
20th-century American businesspeople
20th-century American Jews